Dexter Wayne Shouse (born March 24, 1963) is a retired American basketball player who played college basketball at the University of South Alabama and in the NBA for the Philadelphia 76ers during the 1989-90 NBA season.

Born in Terre Haute, Indiana, Shouse played basketball in the Philippines in the late 1980s for Purefoods Tender Juicy Giants and the Shell Turbo Chargers.  Known for playing with a perpetual scowl, Shouse caught the attention of the NBA's Philadelphia 76ers by averaging a Chamberlain-esque 50 points per game in Manila during the 1989 Philippine Basketball Association season.  Shouse was signed by the 76ers during the 1989-90 season.  Unfortunately for Shouse, his NBA career did not take off as hoped.

Brazilian coaching legend Helio Rubens Garcia called Shouse the most talented player whom he ever had the privilege of coaching.  http://globoesporte.globo.com/bau-do-esporte/noticia/2013/04/top-5-helio-rubens-faz-dream-team-dos-seus-melhores-comandados.html

References 

1963 births
Living people
American expatriate basketball people in Brazil
American expatriate basketball people in the Philippines
American expatriate basketball people in Venezuela
American men's basketball players
Baltimore Lightning players
Basketball players from Indiana
Franca Basquetebol Clube players
Junior college men's basketball players in the United States
Kansas City Sizzlers players
Los Angeles Lakers draft picks
Panteras de Miranda players
Philadelphia 76ers players
Philippine Basketball Association imports
Point guards
Magnolia Hotshots players
Shell Turbo Chargers players
South Alabama Jaguars men's basketball players
Sportspeople from Terre Haute, Indiana
Tulsa Fast Breakers players